The FIVB Senior World Rankings is a ranking system for men's and women's national teams in volleyball. The teams of the member nations of Fédération Internationale de Volleyball (FIVB), volleyball's world governing body, are ranked based on their game results with the most successful teams being ranked highest. A points system is used, with points being awarded based on the results of all FIVB-recognised full international matches. The rankings are used in international competitions to define the seeded teams and arrange them in pools. Specific procedures for seeding and pooling are established by the FIVB in each competition's formula, but the method usually employed is the serpentine system.

The ranking system has been revamped in 2020, responding to criticism that the preceding calculation method did not effectively reflect the relative strengths of the national teams. The old version of the ranking system was finally used on 31 January 2020. 

As of 16 November 2022, the highest ranked team in the men's category is Poland, while in the women's category is the Serbia.

Previous calculation method

The system of point attribution for the selected FIVB World and Official Competitions below is as follows:
Olympic Games and qualifying tournaments: included for 4 years and points are also granted for the qualification matches, to the best non-qualified teams.
World Championship and qualifying tournaments: included for 4 years and points are also granted for the qualification matches, to the best non-qualified teams.
World Cup: included for 4 years 
World Grand Prix: included for 1 year
World League: included for 1 year

Current calculation method
In 2019, FIVB collaborated with Hypercube Business Innovation of the Netherlands to design a new world ranking platform. The previous calculation method had a problem of circularity in the international volleyball calendar: only countries who participate in the major volleyball events can earn ranking points, whilst the number of ranking points of countries also determines seeding and access of teams for major events. This unfair principle does not contribute to the sporting and commercial quality of volleyball.

On 1 February 2020, the new ranking system will be implemented and will take into account all results from 1 January 2019. The system will be consistently updated to reflect the latest results and performances. The new World Ranking considers the match results from all official competitions:
Olympic Games and qualifying tournaments
FIVB World Championship
FIVB World Cup 
FIVB Nations League and Challenger Cup
Confederations' Championship and qualifying tournaments
Other annual official events organized by Continental Confederations.

The rankings outcome of each match depends on two main factors:
The playing strength of the teams competing
The actual match performance or final result of the match

Ranking Procedure
It is based on the zero-sum system, like CONCACAF Ranking Index, and after each game points will be added to or subtracted from a team's rating according to the formula:

where:
 – the team's number of World Ranking scores  after the game
 – the team's number of World Ranking scores  before the game
 – the match importance:
 10.0 – Other annual official events organized by Continental Confederations
 17.5 – Confederations' Championship qualifying
 20.0 – FIVB Challenger Cup
 35.0 – Olympic Games qualifying, FIVB World Cup and Confederations' Championship
 40.0 – FIVB Nations League
 45.0 – FIVB World Championship 
 50.0 – Olympic Games
 – the result of the game depended on match and sets won (3-0, 3-1, 3-2, 2-3, 1-3 or 0-3)
 – the expected result of the game has the value between -2 and +2.  If the match is completely balanced, the expected result is 0. The bigger the surprise, the more points are transferred.

Strength difference between the teams

where:
 – the team A's number of World Ranking scores before the game
 – the team B's number of World Ranking scores before the game

Probability of outcomes
Team A win 3–0

Team A win 3–1

Team A win 3–2

Team A lose 2–3

Team A lose 1–3

Team A lose 0–3

where:
 – the cut-points in the normal distribution that represent the average outcome of a match between two equal strength opponents derived from the actual match results of the past decade

Expected match result

where:
 – the actual result or set score variant 
 – A win 3–0
 – A win 3–1
 – A win 3–2
 – A lose 2–3
 – A lose 1–3
 – A lose 0–3

Examples
There are the examples of the new ranking procedure.

Before the match at the FIVB Volleyball World Championship (K = 45), Brazil (Team A) is ranked number 1 with a 415 WR score and Japan (Team B) is ranked number 11 with a 192 WR score. 

Strength difference between Brazil and Japan

Expected match result

 

Expected match result for Brazil:

Expected match result for Japan:

World Ranking scores after Brazil win 3–0
World Ranking scores for Brazil:

World Ranking scores for Japan: 

World Ranking scores after Brazil win 3–1
World Ranking scores for Brazil:

World Ranking scores for Japan: 

World Ranking scores after Brazil win 3–2
World Ranking scores for Brazil:

World Ranking scores for Japan: 

World Ranking scores after Brazil lose 0–3
World Ranking scores for Brazil:

World Ranking scores for Japan: 

World Ranking scores after Brazil lose 1–3
World Ranking scores for Brazil:

World Ranking scores for Japan: 

World Ranking scores after Brazil lose 2–3
World Ranking scores for Brazil:

World Ranking scores for Japan:

World and Continental Rankings

The five Continental Rankings filter the World Ranking points won and lost in matches played between teams from the same Continental Confederation.
Intercontinental Tournaments – calculated in World Rankings, but some matches can be calculated in Continental Rankings 
Olympic Games final and intercontinental qualification tournaments 
FIVB World Championship final and intercontinental qualification tournaments 
FIVB World Cup 
FIVB Volleyball Nations League and Challenger Cup
some Continental Cups: Pan-America
some FIVB recognised international events, e.g. Pan American Games, Montreux Volley Masters

Continental Tournaments – calculated in World and Continental Rankings 
Olympic Games continental qualification tournaments 
FIVB World Championship continental qualification tournaments 
FIVB Challenger Cup qualification tournaments 
Continental Championships: Asia (AVC), Africa (CAVB), Europe (CEV), North America (NORCECA), and South America (CSV)
some Continental Cups: Asia (both AVC Cup and Challenge Cup) 
Zonal Championships, e.g. Eastern Asia, ASEAN, Central America
some FIVB recognised international events, e.g. African Games, Asian Games, European Games

Examples
Japan (Asian Volleyball Confederation) vs Italy (Confédération Européenne de Volleyball)
The points calculated in FIVB World Rankings.

Japan (Asian Volleyball Confederation) vs South Korea (Asian Volleyball Confederation)
The points calculated in FIVB World Rankings, and AVC Continental Rankings.

FIVB World Rankings

Top ranked men's national teams

Men's rank leaders
For historical men's FIVB rankings from October 2005 to present.

Top ranked women's national teams

Women's rank leaders
For historical women's FIVB rankings from September 2005 to present.

See also

FIVB Senior Continental Rankings
FIVB Youth and Junior World Rankings

Notes and references

 

World Rankings
Volleyball-related lists
Sports world rankings